Ator, the Fighting Eagle (translated: "Ator the Invincible") is a 1982 Italian adventure-fantasy film directed by Joe D'Amato, and the first film to feature the character Ator (played by Miles O'Keeffe).

Plot
As the film opens, a baby named Ator is born with a birthmark that signals he will someday destroy the Spider Cult, which currently holds power over the land. Fearing this prophecy, the leader of the cult — High Priest of The Ancient One, Dakkar (Dakar) — attempts to kill the baby. Baby Ator's birthmark is covered up, however, and he is whisked off to a village far away where he is given to a couple to raise as their own. Years later, Ator (O'Keefe), now in love with his sister Sunya (Brown), asks his father for permission to marry her. Ator's father reveals to Ator that he is adopted, and can therefore marry Sunya if he likes. On the day of their wedding, the village is raided by the Spider Cult's soldiers and several women are taken, including Ator's new bride.

After pursuing the soldiers, Ator soon finds himself training with Griba, a warrior who is an enemy of The Ancient One and also the person who whisked him away at his birth. Griba disappears, though, after which Amazons kidnap Ator, nearly seduced by a witch, and undergoes a quest to retrieve a magical mirrored shield. While kidnapped by the Amazons, Ator is "won" by Roon (Siani), a fierce blonde thief he helped earlier in the film. Roon is enamored with Ator, so she decides to flee with him and assist him during his quest. Ator successfully obtains the mirror, then uses it to fight and defeat Dakkar. His victory is muddied by the revelation that Griba is actually Dakkar's predecessor and had trained Ator so that he could retake his position as High Priest.

Ator defeats Griba, however, leaving him to be devoured by the offspring of The Ancient One, a giant spider that dwells within the temple. To ensure that the cult does not return, Ator then provokes and kills The Ancient One itself. Afterward, with Roon having perished while infiltrating the temple, Ator and Sunya head back to their village, presumably to live in peace together.

Cast
 Miles O'Keeffe as Ator
 Sabrina Siani as Roon 
 Ritza Brown as Sunya 
 Edmund Purdom as Griba 
 Dakar as High Priest of the Spider (as Dakkar) 
 Laura Gemser as Indun 
 Alessandra Vazzoler as Woman in the tavern (as Chandra Vazzoler)
 Nello Pazzafini as Bardak (as Nat Williams) 
 Jean Lopez as Nordya 
 Olivia Goods as Queen

Production 
Michele Soavi was hired to write the script for Ator, the Fighting Eagle. He did it in collaboration with Marco Modugno. Both had previously worked together on the film Bambulè (1979)—Modugno as director, Soavi as assistant director. The film was developed under the working title of Fantasy.

Later, the script was revised by José Maria Sanchez and the film's director Joe D'Amato. D'Amato said in an interview that the script was "written by Jose Maria Sanchez", without mentioning Soavi or Modugno. In the credits, the pseudonym "Sherry Russel" was used.

In a statement printed in the Italian magazine Nocturno, director Joe D'Amato complained that although Miles O'Keeffe, the actor who played Ator, had a nice athletic physique and was a really nice guy (lang-it:un ragazzo d'oro), he recited his lines badly and was behaving listlessly during fight scenes. D'Amato praised the weapons master Franco Ukmar for doing "an incredible job" on him.

Release
Ator, the Fighting Eagle passed the Italian censorship board on 14 September 1982 and was released in Italy on 7 October. It was released in the United States on 11 March 1983.

The film was featured in Season 12 of Mystery Science Theater 3000 on November 22, 2018 as well as Rifftrax.

A Blu-ray release was set for September 2019 by Dark Force Entertainment. However, a few days after the release was announced, a controversial Facebook post surfaced promoting the movie, which contained a reference to Seth Ator, who killed 7 people and injured 25 others, including a 17-month-old girl, during a mass shooting in Odessa, Texas. The post resulted in backlash from Dark Force's customers and the families of the victims. On September 3, Dark Force announced the release was cancelled due to the controversial post. The film was finally released on Blu-ray in May 2020.

Reception
Variety described the film as a "dull, incredibly silly fantasy adventure" and that the director "creates no atmosphere, with picture's exteriors never achieving any period feel".

The Canadian magazine FFWD stated that "there are four Ator movies in total, and each one is staggeringly 
awful".

See also 
 List of Italian films of 1982

References

Footnotes

Sources

External links
 

1982 films
1980s fantasy adventure films
1980s Italian-language films
English-language Italian films
1980s English-language films
Ator
Films directed by Joe D'Amato
Films scored by Carlo Maria Cordio
Italian fantasy adventure films
Sword and sorcery films
Peplum films
Sword and sandal films
1982 multilingual films
Italian multilingual films
1980s Italian films